Montenegro participated in the Eurovision Song Contest 2019 in Tel Aviv, Israel with the song "Heaven" performed by D mol. The group won the national final Montevizija 2019, where they were credited as D-Moll. The spelling of their name was later changed to D mol.

Background 

The nation's best placing in the contest was thirteenth, which they achieved in 2015 with the song "" performed by Knez. In , Montenegro qualified to the final for the first time since they began participating and have since featured in the final of the Eurovision Song Contest two times up to this point. The nation briefly withdrew from the competition between 2010 and 2011 citing financial difficulties as the reason for their absence. In 2007 and 2008, the Montenegrin entry was selected via the national final MontenegroSong. Since 2009, the broadcaster had opted to internally select both the artist and song that would represent Montenegro. For the selection of the 2018 entry, RTCG, the national broadcaster, opted to return to a national final format. In 2018, Montenegro failed to qualify to the final, placing 16th in the second semi-final with the song "" performed by Vanja Radovanović.

Before Eurovision

Montevizija 2019
Montevizija 2019 was the national final organised by RTCG in order to select Montenegro's entry for the Eurovision Song Contest 2019. Five entries competed in a televised final on 9 February 2019, which was held at the RTCG studios in Podgorica and hosted by Ajda Šufta and Ivan Maksimović. The show was televised on TVCG 1, TVCG SAT and RTCG HD as well as broadcast online via the broadcaster's website rtcg.me.

Competing entries 
Artists and songwriters were able to submit their entries between 28 October 2018 and 28 November 2018. Songwriters of any nationality were allowed to submit entries, but songs were required to be either in Montenegrin or English. At the closing of the deadline, RTCG received 27 entries. A selection jury consisting of composer Slaven Knezović, singer Vladimir Maraš, music and singing teacher Aleksandra Vojvodić Jovović, composer Slobodan Bučevac and producer, composer and arranger Mihailo Radonjić evaluated and marked the received submissions against a number of criteria: up to 50 points for composition, up to 30 points for lyrics and up to 20 points for the production potential of the composition. The top five entries were selected for the national final. The selected entries were announced on 18 December 2018.

Final 
The final took place on 9 February 2019. The winner was selected over two rounds of voting. In the first round, the combination of the votes of an international jury (25%), a Montenegrin expert jury (25%), a radio jury (25%) and public SMS voting (25%) selected the top two entries proceeded to the second round, the superfinal. In the superfinal, "Heaven" performed by D-moll was selected as the winner entirely by public SMS voting.

The international jury panel consisted of:
 Ruslana (Ukraine) – winner of the Eurovision Song Contest 2004
 Eldar Gasimov (Azerbaijan) – winner of the Eurovision Song Contest 2011
 Lea Sirk (Slovenia) – represented Slovenia in the Eurovision Song Contest 2018
 András Kállay-Saunders (Hungary) – represented Hungary in the Eurovision Song Contest 2014
 Ira Losco (Malta) – represented Malta in the Eurovision Song Contest 2002 and 2016
 Jovan Radomir (Sweden) – television presenter

At Eurovision 
According to Eurovision rules, all nations with the exceptions of the host country and the "Big Five" (France, Germany, Italy, Spain and the United Kingdom) are required to qualify from one of two semi-finals in order to compete for the final; the top ten countries from each semi-final progress to the final. The European Broadcasting Union (EBU) split up the competing countries into six different pots based on voting patterns from previous contests, with countries with favourable voting histories put into the same pot. On 28 January 2019, a special allocation draw was held which placed each country into one of the two semi-finals, as well as which half of the show they would perform in. Montenegro was placed into the first semi-final, to be held on 14 May 2019, and was scheduled to perform in the first half of the show.

Once all the competing songs for the 2019 contest had been released, the running order for the semi-finals was decided by the shows' producers rather than through another draw, so that similar songs were not placed next to each other. Montenegro was set to perform in position 2, following the entry from Cyprus and preceding the entry from Finland.

Semi-final
Montenegro performed second in the first semi-final, following the entry from Cyprus and preceding the entry from Finland. At the end of the show, Montenegro was not announced among the top 10 entries in the first semi-final and therefore failed to qualify to compete in the final. It was later revealed that Montenegro placed sixteenth in the semi-final, receiving a total of 46 points: 15 points from the televoting and 31 points from the juries.

Voting
Voting during the three shows involved each country awarding two sets of points from 1-8, 10 and 12: one from their professional jury and the other from televoting. Each nation's jury consisted of five music industry professionals who are citizens of the country they represent, with their names published before the contest to ensure transparency. This jury judged each entry based on: vocal capacity; the stage performance; the song's composition and originality; and the overall impression by the act. In addition, no member of a national jury was permitted to be related in any way to any of the competing acts in such a way that they cannot vote impartially and independently. The individual rankings of each jury member as well as the nation's televoting results will be released shortly after the grand final.

Points awarded to Montenegro

Points awarded by Montenegro

Detailed voting results
The following members composed the Montenegrin jury:
 Vjera Nikolić (jury chairperson)music professor
 Verica Čuljkovićmusic professor
 Marko Pešićmusician, represented Montenegro in the 2016 contest as member of Highway
 Saša Barjaktarovićmusic professor
 Igor Perovićmusician, journalist

References 

2019
Countries in the Eurovision Song Contest 2019
Eurovision